Baisha is a town of Yulong Naxi Autonomous County, Yunnan, China. , it has 5 villages under its administration.

References

Township-level divisions of Lijiang
Yulong Naxi Autonomous County